Erra-Imittī, (cuneiform: dèr-ra-i-mit-ti or èr-ra-ZAG.LU meaning “Support of Erra”) ca. 1805–1799 BC (short chronology) or ca. 1868–1861 BC (middle chronology), was king of Isin, modern Ishan al-Bahriyat, and according to the Sumerian King List ruled for eight years. He succeeded Lipit-Enlil, with whom his relationship is uncertain and was a contemporary and rival of Sūmû-El and Nūr-Adad of the parallel dynasty of Larsa. He is best known for the legendary tale of his demise, Shaffer’s “gastronomic mishap”.

Biography

He seems to have recovered control of Nippur from Larsa early in his reign but perhaps lost it again, as its recovery is celebrated again by his successor. The later regnal year-names offer some glimmer of events, for example “the year following the year Erra-Imittī seized Kisurra" (the modern site of Abū-Ḥaṭab) for the date of a receipt for a bridal gift and “the year Erra-Imittī destroyed the city wall of Kazallu,” a city allied with Larsa and antagonistic to Isin and its ally, Babylon. His conquest of Kisurra would have been a significant escalation of hostilities against Isin's rival Larsa. A haematite cylinder seal of his servant and scribe Iliška-uṭul, son of Sîn-ennam, has come to light from this city, suggesting prolonged occupation. The latest attested year-name gives the year he built the city wall of gan-x-Erra-Imittī, perhaps an eponymous new town.

When the omens predicted impending doom for a monarch, it was customary to appoint a substitute as a "statue though animate", a scape-goat who stood in the place of the king but did not exercise power for a hundred days to deflect the disaster, at the end of which the proxy and his spouse would be ritually slaughtered and the king would resume his throne. The Chronicle of Early Kings relates that:

Presumably his error was to remain in the palace while the substitute ceremony was conducted. While the tale may be apocryphal, it provides a literary demarcation between dynasties. He was succeeded by Ikūn-pî-Ištar, according to two variant copies of the Sumerian King List, or Enlil-bâni, if the other sources are correct.

Inscriptions

Notes

External links 
 Erra-Imittī Year Names at CDLI

References 

19th-century BC Sumerian kings
18th-century BC Sumerian kings
Dynasty of Isin